James N. Aparo (August 24, 1932 – July 19, 2005) was an American comic book artist, best known for his DC Comics work from the late 1960s through the 1990s, including on the characters Batman, Aquaman, and the Spectre, along with famous stories such as The Brave and the Bold,  "A Death in the Family", and  "KnightFall".

Early life
Jim Aparo was born on August 24th, 1932, Aparo was raised in New Britain, Connecticut,  Aparo took art classes at New Britain high school and while also taking courses at Hartford Art School. Aparo was primarily self-taught by studying and copying comic books. Growing up and taking inspiration from characters such as Superman, Batman, and Captain Marvel. Aparo was influenced by artists such as Alex Raymond and Milton Caniff.  Aparo started his comic career later than most artists around the time working in advertising first while sending his art to various comic book publishers.  On a summer vacation in Charlton, Aparo ran into  Dick Giordano (The future executive editor of  DC Comics) who saw potential in his work.

Career

Charlton Comics
He attempted to enter the comic book profession in his early 20s, approaching EC Comics, which declined to hire him. He then worked in the advertising industry in Connecticut, often drawing fashion illustrations for newspaper advertisements. He continued to pursue a career in comic books and comic strips while working in advertising.

His first break in the comics field was with the comic strip Stern Wheeler, written by Ralph Kanna, which was published in 1963 in a Hartford, Connecticut newspaper for less than a year. In 1966, editor Dick Giordano at Charlton Comics hired him as a comic book artist, where his first assignment was a humorous character called "Miss Bikini Luv" in "Go-Go Comics."

Over the next few years at Charlton, Aparo drew stories in many genres—Westerns, science fiction, romance, horror, mystery, and suspense. Most of his work was for standalone stories in anthology titles, but he also drew the historical-adventure feature "Thane of Bagarth" in the comic book Hercules; the superheroine feature "Nightshade" in Captain Atom; the science fiction/Western/comedy backup "Wander" in Cheyenne Kid; and the comic book adaptation of the comic strip The Phantom.

Aparo was paid $15 to $20 per page at his time at Charlton Comics.

Aparo was one of the few artists in mainstream comics at that time to serve as penciller, inker, and letterer for all of his work.

DC Comics
In the late 1960s, Dick Giordano left Charlton for an editorial position at DC Comics and offered Aparo a job drawing the Aquaman comic book. After an initial issue (#40) for which Aparo provided only pencil art, Aparo resumed producing pencils, inks, and letters for most issues of the series until its cancellation. Aparo continued for a time to provide art to Charlton for The Phantom, alternating between the two series month by month as both series were being released on a bimonthly basis at the time.

Eventually Aparo resigned his assignment on The Phantom and worked almost exclusively for the remainder of his career for DC Comics. Aparo's next series assignment at DC was Phantom Stranger. After Aquaman was cancelled, the bimonthly frequency of Phantom Stranger was insufficient to fill his typical production rate of one page per day, so DC assigned him several short jobs such as mystery stories for House of Mystery and House of Secrets.

In 1971, Aparo was assigned a fill-in job as the artist for The Brave and the Bold #98 (Oct.–Nov. 1971). This series routinely featured team-ups of DC's Batman with other characters, in this case, the Phantom Stranger. As the regular artist on the Phantom Stranger's own series, Aparo was considered an appropriate choice. Murray Boltinoff, the editor of The Brave and the Bold, soon assigned Aparo the regular artistic responsibilities for the series (beginning with #100), which he continued until its cancellation with issue #200, missing only a few issues. Aparo even "co-starred" as himself in The Brave and the Bold #124 (January 1976).

During the more than 10 years as the artist for The Brave and the Bold, its bimonthly frequency permitted Aparo to do many other significant works for DC (it became monthly in Nov. 1978). In addition to numerous covers, he served as the regular artist for a notorious series starring a ruthless avenging ghost called the Spectre, which ran in Adventure Comics, and which in 2005 was collected in a trade paperback edition. He also provided art for a revival of Aquaman in both Adventure Comics and a continuation of the previously-cancelled Aquaman. He was assigned the solo Batman series in Detective Comics as of issue #437 (Oct.–Nov. 1973) for a rather short time and drew occasional stories for anthology series. Aparo and writer Len Wein introduced Sterling Silversmith in Detective Comics #446 (April 1975). He drew The Untold Legend of the Batman, the first Batman miniseries, in 1980, inking John Byrne's pencils in the first issue and providing full art for the second and third issues. Aparo was one of the artists on the double-sized Justice League of America #200 (March 1982).

When The Brave and the Bold was cancelled in 1983, it was replaced with a series called Batman and the Outsiders, a superhero team led by Batman. This series, which Aparo co-created with writer Mike W. Barr, would be described by DC Comics writer and executive Paul Levitz as being "a team series more fashionable to 1980s audiences." The Masters of Disaster were among the supervillains created by Barr and Aparo for the series. It would run for several years, continuing with a Baxter paper spinoff titled The Outsiders that did not include Batman and introduced Looker. For the final few issues, DC began to request that Aparo provide only pencils, and a long and nearly unbroken string of Aparo inking and lettering his own work came mostly to an end.

Aparo's next major work consisted of pencils for Batman and Detective Comics, where his art was almost always inked by Mike DeCarlo. Aparo returned to the Batman title with issue #414 (Dec. 1987) in collaboration with writer Jim Starlin. One of their first storylines for the title was "Ten Nights of The Beast" in issues #417–420 (March–June 1988) which introduced the KGBeast. Perhaps the most notable product of this period remains "A Death in the Family" (Batman #426–429, 1988–1989), depicting the death of Jason Todd (Robin). The "A Lonely Place of Dying" storyline crossed over with The New Titans title and introduced Tim Drake as the new Robin. Aparo continued to draw Batman stories in Detective and Batman until the early 1990s. During this time, he was the regular artist on Batman when Bane broke Bruce Wayne's back during the "KnightFall" storyline. In 1992, Aparo returned to do pencils, inks, and lettering for his Batman stories, but was soon returned to contributing only pencil art.

Also that year, Aparo was given his last regular series assignment for DC as pencil artist for Green Arrow issues #81–100. He and writer Kelley Puckett co-created Connor Hawke, the son of Green Arrow. Following that assignment, Aparo's work appeared infrequently, when Aparo was mostly assigned occasional Batman-related stories and covers in miniseries and specials. His published work in the late 1990s and early 2000s include a Batman Annual inked by former Marvel Comics mainstay Sal Buscema, a G.C.P.D. miniseries, a Speed Force Special featuring the Flash, an issue of a Deadman miniseries that revisited his "Death in the Family" story, and a single page of Green Lantern/Superman: Legend of the Green Flame written by Neil Gaiman in which he had a final opportunity to draw the Phantom Stranger for publication.

His final work for DC during his life was the cover of the trade paperback Batman in the Eighties, published in 2004. In 2006, previously-unpublished Aparo art depicting the unused, alternate ending of the storyline "A Death in the Family," in which the Jason Todd Robin lives instead of dies, appeared in Batman Annual #25.

Death
Aparo died on July 19, 2005, at his home in Southington, Connecticut. At least one report attributed the cause of death to "a long battle with cancer", but his family's formal announcement said his death came from "complications relating to a recent illness". DC Comics ran an Aparo "In Memoriam" page in Batman #644 (Oct. 2005) and Detective Comics #811 (Nov. 2005).

Awards
Aparo was (automatically inducted) into the prestigious:
 Will Eisner Hall of Fame in 2019
 the Shazam Award for "Best Individual Short Story (Dramatic)" in 1972 for "The Demon Within" in House of Mystery #201 with John Albano 
 the Inkpot Award in 1993

Bibliography
Comics work (interior pencil art) includes:

Charlton Comics

 Captain Atom (Nightshade) #87–89 (Aug. 1967–Dec. 1967)
 Career Girl Romances #40 (June 1967)
 Charlton Premiere #4 (May 1968)
 Cheyenne Kid #66–71 (May 1968–March 1969)
 Ghost Manor #77 (Nov. 1984)
 Ghostly Tales #65–68, 71–72, 74–76, 79, 81, 137, 141–142, 146, 149, 153, 164 (Feb. 1968–Dec. 1983)
 Go-Go #5–9 (Feb. 1967–Oct. 1967)
 Gunfighter #52, 83 (Oct. 1967 and March 1984)
 Hercules: Adventures of the Man-God #1–10 (1968–1969)
 I Love You #67 (April 1967)
 Love Diary #62, 66 (Oct. 1969 and May 1970)
 The Many Ghosts of Doctor Graves #4–5, 7–8, 17, 66, 69 (1967–1981)
 Peter Cannon, Thunderbolt #60 (1967) [Prankster]
 The Phantom #31–34, 36–38 (1969–1970)
 Romantic Story #94 (July 1968)
 Scary Tales #22 (Oct, 1980)
 Secret Agent #10 (Oct. 1967) [Tiffany Sinn]
 Space Adventures #2, 4 (July and Nov. 1968)
 Space Adventures Presents U.F.O. #60 (Oct. 1967)
 Strange Suspense Stories vol. 2 #1–2, 4 (Oct. 1967–Nov. 1968)

DC Comics

 Adventure Comics (Adventurers' Club) #426–427; (Spectre) #431–433, 435–436, 440; (Aquaman) #441–452; (Deadman) #459–461, 464 (1973–1979)
 All-Star Western (vol. 2) #5 (1971)
 Aquaman #40–59 (1968–1978)
 Aquaman (vol. 3) #52 (flashback sequence) (1999)
 Azrael Annual #3 (1997)
 Batman #414–420, 426–435, 440–448, 450–451, 480–483, 486–491, 494–500, 533–534, 558, 560–562 (1987–1999)
 Batman Annual #24 (2000), Batman Annual #25 (2006)
 Batman and the Outsiders #1–9, 11–12, 16–20 (1983–1985)
 Batman: Blackgate Isle of Men (1998)
 Batman: Brotherhood of the Bat (1996)
 The Batman Chronicles #7, 14 (1997–1998)
 Batman Family #17 (Batman, Robin, and Huntress) (1978)
 Batman: GCPD #1–4 (miniseries) (1996)
 Batman: Legends of the Dark Knight #142–145, Annual #1 (1991–2001)
 Batman: Shadow of the Bat #61, 68 (1997)
 The Brave and the Bold #98, 100–102, 104–136, 138–145, 147, 149–152, 154–155, 157–162, 168–170, 173–178, 180–182, 184, 186–189, 191–193, 195–196, 200 (1971–1983)
 DCU Holiday Bash #1 (1996)
 Deadman: Dead Again #2 of 5 (miniseries) (2001)
 Detective Comics #437–438, 444–446, 500, 625–632, 638–643, 716, 719, 722, 724 (1973–1998)
 Ghosts #1 (1971)
 Green Arrow #0, 81–88, 91–95, 98–100, 109, 123 (1993–1997)
 House of Mystery #192, 201, 209 (1971–1972)
 House of Secrets #93, 97, 105 (1971–1973)
 Justice League of America #200 (among other artists) (1982)
 Mystery in Space #111 (1980)
 Outsiders #1–7, 9–14, 17–22, 25–26 (1985–1988)
 Phantom Stranger (vol. 2) #7–26 (1969–1973)
 Secret Origins (vol. 2) #10 (Phantom Stranger) (1987)
 Spectre (vol. 3) #16 (1994)
 Speed Force #1 (The Flash/Kid Flash story) (1997)
 Steel #33 (1996)
 Superboy and the Ravers #8 (1997)
 Teen Titans #36 (Aqualad) (1971)
 Time Warp #1 (1979)
 The Unexpected #127, 132 (1971–1972)
 The Untold Legend of the Batman #2–3 (miniseries) (1980)
 Witching Hour #25 (1972)
 Wrath of the Spectre #4 (miniseries) (1988)

Collections
 Legends of the Dark Knight: Jim Aparo
 Vol. 1 collects The Brave and the Bold #98, 100–102, 104–122. 512 pages, April 2012, 
 Vol. 2 collects The Brave and the Bold #123–145 and 147–151, Detective Comics #437–438. 528 pages, October 2013, 
 Vol. 3 collects The Brave and the Bold #152, 154–155, 157–162, 168–179, 173–178, 180–182, Detective Comics #444–446, 448, 468–470, Batman Family #17, and various covers from those titles. 520 pages, August 2017 
 Batman: The Brave and the Bold -- The Bronze Age Omnibus
 Vol. 1 collects The Brave and the Bold #74–106. 904 pages, January 2017, 
 Vol. 2 collects The Brave and the Bold #110–156. 776 pages, September 2018, 
 Vol. 3 collects The Brave and the Bold #157–200. 904 pages, (publication date September 2021) 
 Batman and the Outsiders
 Vol. 1 collects The Brave and the Bold #200, Batman and the Outsiders #1–13, New Teen Titans #37. 368 pages, February 2017, 
 Vol. 2 collects Batman and the Outsiders Annual #1, Batman and the Outsiders #14–23. 312 pages, February 2018, 
 Jim Aparo's Complete The Phantom
 Collects The Phantom #31–34, #36–38. Also, essays on Jim Aparo with original art. 192 pages, January 2017, 
 Aquaman: a Celebration of 75 Years
 collects Adventure Comics #120, 174, 220, 260, 266, 269, 444, 452, and 475, Aquaman (vol. 1) #1, 18, 40, Aquaman (vol. 2) #3, Aquaman (vol. 3) #2, 34, Aquaman (vol. 4) #4, 17, Aquaman (vol. 5) #1, 43. 400 pages, October 2016, 
 Aquaman: Death of A Prince
 collects Adventure Comics #435–437, #441–455, Aquaman #57–63. 336 pages, July 2011,  with a reprint deluxe hardcover edition published February 2020 
 Aquaman: The Search for Mera
 collects Aquaman #40–48. 216 pages, November 2018, 
 Aquaman: The Deadly Waters
 collects Aquaman #49–56. 208 pages, August 2020, 
 Wrath of the Spectre
 collects Adventure Comics #431–440, Wrath of the Spectre #1–4. 200 pages, June 2005, 
 Deadman Book Four
 collects DC Special Series #8, Adventure Comics #459–466, DC Comics Presents #24. 168 pages, January 2014, 
 DC Universe by Len Wein
 collects Phantom Stranger #20–24 (Aparo), Action Comics, DC Comics Presents and more. 384 pages, February 2019 
 The Joker The Bronze Age Omnibus
 collects The Joker #1–10, Batman 251, 260, 286, 291–294, 321, 353, 365–366, and 400, The Brave and the Bold 111, 118, 129–130, 141, and 191, Detective Comics 475–476, 504, 526, and 532, Wonder Woman 280–283, DC Comics Presents 41 and 72, and more. Jim Aparo's art appears on 11 of the issues included, fully one fourth of the content, and his interior art is featured in all of The Brave and the Bold issues included. Furthermore, Aparo's rendition of the Joker is embossed in raised features on the back of the hardcover book. 832 pages, August 2019 
 The Spectre: The Wrath of the Spectre Omnibus
 collects Showcase #60, 61, 64, The Brave & the Bold 72, 75, 116, 180, and 199, The Spectre 1–10, Adventure Comics 431–440, DC Comics Presents 29, Wrath of the Spectre #4, and Ghosts 97–99. Jim Aparo's did all of the art in 7 of the 10 Adventure issues, and 2 of the Brave and Bold issues. He also inked the remaining Adventure comics, and penciled 40 pages of art for the 1988 Wrath of Spectre special editions, and illustrated the cover for Brave & the Bold 199 -- which means his art is more than one third of the content of the omnibus. In addition, Aparo's art is used for both the cover of the book, and the dustjacket, including the jacket flaps. 680 pages, September 2020 
 Deadman Omnibus
 collects Strange Adventures 205–216, The Brave & the Bold 79, 86, 104, and 133, Aquaman 50–52, Challengers of the Unknown 74, 84–87, Justice League of America 94, World's finest 223 and 227, The Phantom Stranger 33, 39–41 Superman Family 183, DC Superstars 18, DC Comics Presents 24, Adventure Comics 459–466, Detective Comics 500, Secret Origins 15, Deadman 1–4 (1986). Jim Aparo did interior art for six issues in the omnibus, and cover art for 10 other issues. 944 pages, December 2020 
 The Phantom Stranger Omnibus
 collects The Phantom Stranger 1–6 (1952), The Phantom Stranger 1–41 (1969), The Saga of the Swamp Thing 1–13, Who's Who: The Definitive Directory of the DC Universe 18, The Brave and the Bold 89, 98, 145, Showcase 80, Justice League of America 103, House of Secrets 150, DC Superstars 18, Secret Origins 10, and DC Comics Presents 25 and 72. 680 pages, May 2022

Notes

References

Further reading
 The Brave and Bold Art of Jim Aparo, TwoMorrows Publishing, TBA  The title to be published by TwoMorrows Publishing, never appeared. No explanation was given by the publisher.

External links
 
 "DC Profile #76: Jim Aparo" at the Grand Comics Database
 Jim Aparo at Mike's Amazing World of Comics

1932 births
2005 deaths
Advertising artists and illustrators
American comics artists
Artists from Connecticut
Inkpot Award winners
People from Southington, Connecticut
Silver Age comics creators
20th-century American artists
DC Comics people